The 2012 United States Senate election in Wyoming took place on November 6, 2012, alongside a U.S. presidential election as well as other elections to the United States Senate and House of Representatives and various state and local elections. Incumbent Republican U.S. Senator John Barrasso won re-election to a first full term.

The primary elections were held August 21, 2012.

Background
Republican state Senator John Barrasso was appointed to the U.S. Senate on June 22, 2007, by then-governor Dave Freudenthal after U.S. Senator Craig Thomas died on June 4, 2007.

John Barrasso defeated Nick Carter with 73.4% of the vote in the 2008 special U.S. senatorial election to serve the remainder of the senatorial term. Barrasso remains highly popular in the state with 69% of voters approving of him.

Republican primary

Candidates
 John Barrasso, incumbent U.S. Senator
 Thomas Bleming, former soldier of fortune
 Emmett Mavy, management consultant

Results

Democratic primary

Candidates
 William Bryk, attorney from Brooklyn and perennial candidate
 Tim Chesnut, member of the Albany County Board of Commissioners
 Al Hamburg, retired painter and perennial candidate

Results

General election

Candidates
 John Barrasso (Republican), incumbent U.S. Senator
 Tim Chesnut (Democratic), member of the Albany County Board of Commissioners
 Joel Otto (Wyoming Country), rancher

Debates
 Complete video of debate, October 31, 2012 - C-SPAN

Predictions

Polling

John Barrasso vs. Dave Freudenthal

Results

See also
 2012 United States Senate elections
 2012 United States House of Representatives election in Wyoming

References

External links
 Elections from the Wyoming Secretary of State
 Campaign contributions at OpenSecrets.org
 Outside spending at Sunlight Foundation
 Candidate issue positions at On the Issues

Official campaign websites
 John Barrasso for U.S. Senate
 Joel Otto for U.S. Senate

2012
Wyoming
Senate